The Joseph Dessert Library (also known as the Marathon County Public Library - Mosinee Branch) at 123 Main St. in Mosinee, Wisconsin was built in 1898 and expanded in 1928. It was designed by architect Alexander C. Eschweiler. It was listed on the National Register of Historic Places in 1980. It is part of the Marathon County Public Library and a member of the Wisconsin Valley Library Service.

Joseph Dessert was a lumberman who came to the area from Quebec in 1844. He worked in a sawmill at Mosinee (then called Little Bull Falls) for a few years, then bought the mill with three partners in 1849. By 1859 he alone owned the mill, and he ran it for forty years. In the interest of his employees, he sponsored construction of this library, appointed the first board of trustees, stocked it with books, and paid for maintenance for several years. This library has been placed on the National Register of historic places by United States Department of Interior.

References

External links
Marathon County Public Library - Mosinee Branch

Library buildings completed in 1928
Libraries on the National Register of Historic Places in Wisconsin
Queen Anne architecture in Wisconsin
Buildings and structures in Marathon County, Wisconsin
1928 establishments in Wisconsin
National Register of Historic Places in Marathon County, Wisconsin